In organometallic chemistry, a tuck-in complex usually refers to derivatives of Cp* ligands wherein a methyl group is deprotonated and the resulting methylene attaches to the metal.  The C5–CH2–M angle is acute. The term "tucked in" was coined to describe derivatives of organotungsten complexes. Although most "tucked-in" complexes are derived from Cp* ligands, other pi-bonded rings undergo similar reactions.

Scope and bonding
The "tuck-in" process is related to ortho-metalation in the sense that it is an intramolecular cyclometalation.  Tuck-in complexes derived from Cp* ligands are derivatives of tetramethylfulvene, sometimes abbreviated Me4Fv.  A variety of complexes are known for Me4Fv and related ligands.  In these complexes, the Fv can serve as a 4-electron or as a 6-electron ligand.

Examples
The original example proceeded via sequential loss of two equivalents of H2 from decamethyltungstocene dihydride, Cp*2WH2.  The first dehydrogenation step affords a simple tuck-in complex: 
(C5Me5)2WH2  →  (C5Me5)(η6-C5Me4CH2)WH  +  H2
The second dehydrogenation step affords a double tuck-in complex:
(C5Me5)(η6-C5Me4CH2)WH   →  (C5Me5)(η7-C5Me3(CH2)2)W +  H2

In organouranium chemistry, both tuck-in and tuck-over complexes are recognized, for example in the dihydrido diuranium complex  [Cp*3(η7-C5Me3(CH2))U2H2].  In this complex the two methylene groups bind to different uranium centers. The tuck-over mode is binding of the Cp* methylene to a metal center elsewhere in the molecule rather than the one coordinated to that Cp* ligand.

Reactions
Tuck-in complexes retain nucleophilicity at the methylene carbon.  They can be activated by Lewis acids to generate active catalysts for use in Ziegler–Natta catalysis. The Lewis acid attaches to the CH2 group, exposing a vacant site on the electrophilic Zr(IV) centre.

References

Organometallic chemistry